Kata Dobó or Kata Dobo (born Katalin Kovács, Hungarian: Kovács Katalin, Dobó Kata on 25 February 1974) is a Hungarian actress and filmmaker.

She was born in Győr, Hungary and moved to Los Angeles, USA in 1999 to her partner of the time, film producer Andrew G. Vajna. She left the States after they split and currently resides in Budapest, Hungary.

Her films include A miniszter félrelép (1997) and Európa expressz (1999).

Recent television work includes an appearance on Lady Heather's Box, an episode of CSI: Crime Scene Investigation, in 2003. In January 2011, she appeared in Bloodlines, the fourth episode in the 14th series of the BBC crime drama Silent Witness, along with fellow Hungarian actors Iván Kamarás and Lili Bordán.

Theatrical roles 
 William Gibson: Two for the seesaw, Presentation: 9 May 2008 Budapest Pince Theatre
 Arisztophanész: Lüszésztraté, Presentation: 3 October 2008 Békéscsaba Jókai Theatre 
 Pszicho, Presentation: 2 October 2009 Budapest Chamber Theatre
 Werner Schwab: Die Prasidentinnen, Presentation: 4 December 2009 Békéscsaba Jókai Theatre
 "Minden ugyanúgy van", Presentation: 28 May 2010 Budapest Mikroszkóp Theatre
 "Érzelmes üzletek", Presentation: 24 September 2010 Budapest Mikroszkóp Theatre
 Roland Topor: Winter Under the Table, Presentation: 19 November 2010 Budaörs Latinovits Theatre
 Schiller: Stuart Maria, Presentation: 14 January 2011 Békéscsaba Jókai Theatre
 William Shakespeare: Lear King, Presentation: 25 April 2013 Békéscsaba Jókai Theatre
 Ron Clark-Sam Babrick: Murder at the Howard Johnson's, Present: 13 Sept. 2013 Bp. Karinthy Theatre 
 Moliere: Tartuffe, Presentation: 13 February 2014 Budapest Pince Theatre
 "Kegyelemkenyér", Presentation: 8 February 2015 Budapest Pince Theatre
 Joe Orton: Loot, Presentation: 23 September 2016 Budapest Karinthy Theatre 
 Ray Cooney-John Chapman:Move Over Mrs. Markham, Presentation: 10 December 2016 Bp. Játékszín Theatre
 Ettore Scola: A Special Day, Presentation: 11 November 2018 Budapest, Hatszín Theatre.
 Paolo Genovese: Perfetti Sconosciuti, Presentation: 23 november 2019 Bp. Játékszín Theatre
 Szente Vajk - Galambos Attila: "Dominógyilkosság". Presentation: 04 June 2021 Bp. Játékszín Theatre

Selected filmography

As actress 
 Éretlenek /TV Series/  (1995-1996)
 Miniszter Félrelép (1997)
 Ámbár Tanár Úr (1998)
 Európa Expressz (1999)
 15 Minutes  (2001)
 An American Rhapsody  (2001)
 Rollerball (2002)
 CSI:Crime Scene Investigation /TV Series/  (2003)
 Detention (2003)
 Out For A Kill (2003)
 Csak Szex És Más Semmi (2005)
 Basic Instinct 2. (2006)
 Szabadság Szerelem (2006)
 Blood and Chocolate (2007)
 Ben David: Broken Sky (2007)
 King Conqueror (2009)
 A Jóéjtpuszi /Short/ (2009)
 Halálkeringő (2010)
 A Néma Szemtanú /TV Series/ (2011)
 Split Perfect /Short/ (2012)
 Hacktion /TV Series/ (2014)
 Fapad /TV Series/ (2014-2015)
 Váltótársak /TV Series/ (2016-2017)
 What If? /Short/ (2016)
 Brazilok (2017)
 Csak színház és más semmi /TV Series/ (2017)
 Egynyári Kaland /TV Series/ (2017)
 Pappa Pia (2017)
 Budapest Noir (2017)
 Korhatáros Szerelem /Tv Series/ (2017-2018)
 I Love You, Too /Short/ (2020)
 Átjáróház (2022)

As director 
 Kölcsönlakás (2019)
 El a kezekkel a Papámtól (2021)

CDs and Audio Books 
 Narrator of Ildikó Boldizsár's novel Boszorkányos mesék (2007)

Other works 
 Music video for Róbert Gergely's "Azok a fehér éjszakák" (1992)
 Hungarian TV commercial for Pepsi Cola (1998–1999)
 Hungarian TV commercial for Pannon GSM (cellphone company) (1998)
 Hungarian commercial for Westel's Domino Card (pre-paid card) (1999)
 Hungarian print ad for Westel's Domino Card (pre-paid card) (1999–2000)
 Appeared on Hungarian Viasat channel's reality show "Bár" as a guest. (20 June 2001)
 TV commercial for Hungarian Hospice Endowment for the Humanities (2001)
 Appeared on Hungarian TV2 channel's reality show "Sztárok a jégen/Dancing on ice" (2007)
 Appeared on Hungarian TV2 channel's show "Stílusvadász" as a presenter. (2013)
 Appeared on Hungarian M1 channel's Game-Show "Magyarország Szeretlek"  (5 October 2014)
 Appeared on Hungarian RTL2 channel's show "NŐComment!" (2018-2021)
 Appeared on Hungarian TV2 channel's show Dancing with the Stars 2.season (2021)

References

External links
 
 Dobokata.hu Kata Dobó's website

1974 births
Hungarian film actresses
Living people
People from Győr